Mates and Models is a 1919 American silent comedy film featuring Oliver Hardy.

Cast
 Jimmy Aubrey as The Husband
 Oliver Hardy as A Nutty Artist (as Babe Hardy)
 Richard Smith as A Rival Artist (as Dick Smith)
 Maude Emory as The Wife

See also
 List of American films of 1919
 Oliver Hardy filmography

External links

1919 films
1919 short films
American silent short films
American black-and-white films
1919 comedy films
Films directed by Noel M. Smith
Silent American comedy films
American comedy short films
1910s American films